Eupithecia craterias is a moth of the family Geometridae. It was first described by Edward Meyrick in 1899. It is endemic to the state of Hawaii.

Subspecies
There are two recognised subspecies:
Eupithecia craterias craterias (Meyrick, 1899) (Oahu, Molokai, Maui)
Eupithecia craterias ditrecta (Meyrick, 1899) (Hawaii)

References

External links

craterias
Endemic moths of Hawaii
Moths described in 1899